Alphonse Barancira is a former minister for Human Rights, Constitutional Reform and Relations
with the National Assembly of Burundi. He belongs to the ANADDE party. He was appointed to the post in 2001. He is a Tutsi.

References

Living people
Year of birth missing (living people)
Government ministers of Burundi
Tutsi people
Place of birth missing (living people)